Iniyum Marichittillatha Nammal is a 1980 Indian Malayalam film, directed by Chintha Ravi. The film stars Sashi Kumar, T. V. Chandran, Kadammanitta Ramakrishnan and Vijayalakshmi in the lead roles.

Cast
Sashi Kumar
T. V. Chandran
Kadammanitta Ramakrishnan
Vijayalakshmi

References

External links
 

1980 films
1980s Malayalam-language films